or  is a fjord in Troms og Finnmark county, Norway. The fjord runs through the municipalities of Tromsø, Karlsøy, and Lyngen. The  fjord flows from the village of Sjøvassbotn northwards along the west side of the Lyngen Peninsula (where the famous Lyngen Alps are located). The Kjosen fjord branches off to the east side and the Grøtsundet strait branches off to the west (which then flows into the Tromsøysundet). The islands of Reinøya and Karlsøya lie along the western side of the fjord. The southern part of the Ullsfjorden is also known as Sørfjorden. The area surrounding the Ullsfjorden was part of the municipality of Ullsfjord for about 60 years during the 20th century.

See also
 List of Norwegian fjords

References

Fjords of Troms og Finnmark
Tromsø
Karlsøy
Lyngen